The 2022 Honda Indy Grand Prix of Alabama was the fourth round of the 2022 IndyCar season. The race was held on May 1, 2022, in Birmingham, Alabama at the Barber Motorsports Park. The race lasted for 90 laps.

Entry list

Practice

Practice 1
Practice 1 took place at 4:00PM ET on April 29, 2022.

Practice 2

Qualifying

Qualifying classification 

 Notes
 Bold text indicates fastest time set in session.

Warmup

Race 
The race started at 1:05PM ET on May 1, 2022.

Race classification

Championship standings after the race 

Drivers' Championship standings

Engine manufacturer standings

 Note: Only the top five positions are included.

References

External links 

Grand Prix of Alabama
Honda Indy Grand Prix of Alabama
Honda Indy Grand Prix of Alabama
Honda Indy Grand Prix of Alabama